Mairy-sur-Marne (literally Mairy on Marne) is a commune in the Marne department in north-eastern France. The village is situated on the river Marne, which travels through Chalons-en-Champagne, Épernay and on to Paris where it links on to the Seine. In the centre of the village is a church, the mayor's office and the village's 17th century Chateau.

Chateau de Mairy is a 'Monument Historique' set in 30 acres of grounds with its own private lake and chapel.

James II stayed regularly in the Chateau during his exile in France.
It was owned by the Loisson de Guinaumont since it was built in 1676.

It is now used as a period guest house and was owned by the Count of Guinaumont until 2004 when he died at the age of 98.

See also
Communes of the Marne department

References

Mairysurmarne